Svobodny is a town in Amur Oblast, Russia, located on the right bank of the Zeya River,  north of Blagoveshchensk, the administrative center of the oblast. Population:  63,889 (2002 Census);

History
It was founded in 1912 in conjunction with the construction of the Amur Railway (the Trans-Siberian Railway's "bypass" route, which was to provide a railway connection from European Russia to the Pacific entirely over the Russian soil, without crossing the north-eastern China). It was originally named Alexeyevsk, in honor of the then crown prince Alexey. In 1917, the town was renamed Svobodny, Russian for "free".

During the Stalin era, the BAMLag prison camp was built in Svobodny, with the intention of providing forced labor for the planned construction of the Baikal-Amur Mainline. The camp became one of the largest in the GULAG system, with ca. 190,300 convicts in October 1935. The camp claimed the lives of thousands of political and clerical prisoners.

Administrative and municipal status
Within the framework of administrative divisions, Svodobny serves as the administrative center of Svobodnensky District, even though it is not a part of it. As an administrative division, it is incorporated separately as Svobodny Urban Okrug—an administrative unit with the status equal to that of the districts. As a municipal division, this administrative unit also has urban okrug status.

Economy
The town is home to factories producing machinery and furniture, as well as the administrative center for mining operations in the region, including the gold mining concern Amurzoloto.

Transportation
The town is an important transportation hub for both rail and river traffic, with two railway stations on the Trans-Siberian Railway including rolling-stock repair facilities, and a river port on the Zeya.

It is served by the Svobodny Airport and is near the Orlovka interceptor air base and other locations maintained by the Russian Air Force.

Climate
Svobodny has a warm-summer humid continental climate (Köppen climate classification Dwb) with bitterly cold, very dry winters and very warm, wet summers.

Notable people
The town is the birthplace of the movie director Leonid Gaidai, whose memorial was unveiled in September 2006.

References

Notes

Sources

Е. М. Поспелов (Ye. M. Pospelov). "Имена городов: вчера и сегодня (1917–1992). Топонимический словарь." (City Names: Yesterday and Today (1917–1992). Toponymic Dictionary.) Москва, "Русские словари", 1993.

Cities and towns in Amur Oblast
Populated places established in 1912
1912 establishments in the Russian Empire
Monotowns in Russia